Mantle Fielding, Jr. (September 30, 1865 – March 27, 1941) was an American architect, art historian, and tennis player.

Career 
Fielding was born in Manhattan to Mantle Fielding (1837–1890) and Anne Margaret Stone (maiden; 1838–1906). He graduated from Germantown Academy in 1883 and went on to study architecture at the Boston School of Technology (MIT), reportedly for one year, likely between the fall of 1883 through the spring of 1884. In 1886, he began his career as an independent architect in Philadelphia. Fielding undertook over 200 works of architecture, mostly in the Philadelphia area for many different patrons.

He also was a historian, biographer, and compiler of early American art, artists, and engravers – notably, his 1926 publication, Dictionary of American Painters, Sculptors, and Engravers.  (see , below)

Tennis; Grand Slam Finals – Mixed Doubles 
Fielding competed in the 1895 and 1896 U.S National Tennis Championships and reached the finals of the mixed doubles events with his future wife Amy Williams. (see , below)

Architectural work 
Fielding's works include:

 1891 – Fielding's own residence – "The Barn" – at 28 West Walnut Lane, Philadelphia, was a renovation by Fielding that was once the Wyck barn, built in 1796 by J. Frederick Thomas.

 1892 – The Terry Building, 207 South Jefferson Street (at Campbell, southeast corner), Roanoke, Virginia. A seven-story Italianesque stone and pressed-brick office building with a mansard roof, became the tallest building in Roanoke. Peyton Leftwich Terry (1835–1898) was the building's namesake. The building was razed in 1926 and, in its place, in 1927, the Colonial National Bank building was erected.

 1898 – The Boys' and Girls' Club, originally called the Boys Parlor Association, 23 West Penn Street, Germantown

 1898 – Robert Early Strawbridge, Jr., Residence, "Meadow Lodge," Bryn Mawr, on the Main Line, which, as described by The New York Times, is a Tudor Country House on 47 acres with gardens, tennis courts, orchard, 17th century English style, half-timbered architecture, carved wood paneling, archways, lead mullioned windows, fire places. The entrance is patterned after Windsor Castle's Great Hall. Thirty-two rooms.

 1899 – The Charles Currie House (Charles Aitken Currie, MD; 1856–1937) at 50 West Walnut Lane in the Tulpehocken Station Historic District, in Philadelphia. The district has been on the National Register of Historic Places since November 26, 1985, and is bounded by on the North by McCallum Street, on the East by West Walnut Lane, on the South by Penn Central railroad tracks, and the West by West Tulpehocken Street, in the Germantown neighborhood, bordering on the Colonial Germantown Historic District, a National Historic Landmark district. This house – named Comawaben (1899) – is a Georgian Revival mansion built in local in Wissahickon schist, that closely aligns with the original Georgian style, except for the large size of the building.

 1902 – James E. Wheeler House (James Everett Wheeler; 1870–1954), lawyer, 82 Edge Hill Road, New Haven, Connecticut, in the Prospect Hill Historic District (1902). His wife, Edith Pemberton Williams (1874–1953) was a 1st cousin of Fielding's wife, Amy Reeve Williams. The house is a 2-story structure with stucco façade.

 1905 – The Tuleyries, White Post, Virginia – Graham Furber Blandy (1868–1926), a nephew of Mrs. Andrew Carnegie, around 1905, acquired The Tuleyries, near White Post, Virginia, and adjacent lands totaling over 900 acres. Blandy hired Mantle Fielding to restore and improve the mansion. Upon Blandy's death, his widow, Georgette Haven Borland (maiden; 1886–1939) inherited part of the Tuleyries estate. The remainder of the estate was bequeathed to the University of Virginia for an experimental farm. (see Blandy Experimental Farm and the Virginia State Arboretum) Graham Blandy (class of 1885), his brother, Isaac Cruse Blandy (1866–1937) (class of 1883), and Fielding (class of 1884) had been students together at the Germantown Academy.

 1906 – The Page Memorial Chapel, Riverside Cemetery, Oswego, New York. The Chapel was commissioned by descendants of Alanson Sumner Page (1825–1905) and Elsie A. Benson (maiden; 1835–1996). A stone structure, Fielding designed it in a Gothic Revival style. Frederick Wilson (1858–1932), a lead designer of Tiffany Studios of New York City, designed the interior windows. The chapel stands at the entrance of the cemetery. The cemetery, in 1993, was designated on the list of National Register of Historic Places.

 1915 – Abington YMCA, Abington Township

Published work (chronological) 

  ;  (
 
 
<li> 
 

  ; .

  .

  ; .

  ; .
 

  ; .

  .

 

  ; .

  ; .

  ; .

   ; .
 

   ; .

   ; .

   (publication);  ;  (article).

Affiliations 
 Walpole Society, member
 T-Square Club, member, joined in 1886
 Art Club of Philadelphia, member
 Pennsylvania Academy of the Fine Arts
 Historical Society of Pennsylvania, member

Family 
Fielding – on November 16, 1898, in Philadelphia – married Amy Reeve Williams (1872–1969). They had two children, Richard Mantle Fielding (1904–1974) and Frances (1906–1966), whose husband, Joseph Allison Scott, Jr. (1900–1959), was (i) a grandson of U.S. Senator from Pennsylvania, John Scott (1824–1896) and (ii) nephew of American cricketer Walter Scott (1868–1907). Mantle Fielding and his wife lived in Germantown, Philadelphia, for many years.

Fielding, at age , died at his home in Chestnut Hill.  His widow, Amy Fielding – on January 7, 1942, in Bala Cynwyd – re-married, to John Duncan Spaeth (1868–1954), an academician.

Bibliography

Notes

References 
General

  ; ; .

  ; ; .

  .

  ; .
The author was the wife of Orme Wilson, Jr., U.S. Ambassador to Haiti under Franklin D. Roosevelt. She was also a sister-in-law of Graham Furber Blandy

 

  .

  .
 Wistar Morris Residence, "Green Hill Farm" Overbrook (p. 75).
 Edward Varian Douglas Residence, 124 West Chestnut Hill Avenue, Chestnut Hill (p. 84).
 Walter Pearce Douglas Residence, 251 West Walnut Lane, Germantown (p. 87).
 Robert Early Strawbridge, Jr., Residence "Meadow Lodge," Bryn Mawr (p. 90)

 

 .

 .

 

  Retrieved August 23, 2022 – via Google Books . ; .
 
 
 

  .

 

Tennis

 
 

<li> June 25–29, 1895.
<li>
 

<li> August 25–28, 1884.
<li>

 June 15–19, 1897
Pennsylvania State Championships, Merion Cricket Club, Haverford.
 June 22–30, 1897.

 
 August 21–24, 1883.
 August 25–28, 1884.
 August 18–21, 1885.
 August 23–28, 1886.
 August 23–28, 1886.
 August 22–30, 1887.
 August 20–25, 1888.
 August 21–28, 1889.

 

 
 June 12–16, 1894.

External links
  .

1865 births
1941 deaths
Architects from New York City
19th-century American architects
American art historians
20th-century American historians
Germantown Academy alumni
MIT School of Architecture and Planning alumni
20th-century American architects
Architects from Philadelphia
Writers from Philadelphia
Sportspeople from New York City
Writers from New York City
American male non-fiction writers
American male tennis players
Tennis people from New York (state)
Tennis players from Philadelphia
Historians from Pennsylvania
Historians from New York (state)